The 10th European Film Awards were presented on 7 December 1997 in Berlin, Germany. The event was hosted by British T.V. presenter Tania Bryer. The Space Dream performers gave a performance early ceremony. German actress Jasmin Tabatabai gave a performance mid-ceremony.

Awards

European Actor of the Year
Bob Hoskins

European Actress of the Year
Juliette Binoche for her role in THE ENGLISH PATIENT

European Cinematographer of the Year
John Seale

European Achievement in World Cinema
Milos Forman for THE PEOPLE VS. LARRY FLYNT. Forman was not present at the event but sent his thanks via video message.

Fassbinder Award
French director Bruno Dumont for LA VIE DE JESUS

European Screenwriter of the Year
Alain Berliner and Chris Vander Stappen for MA VIE EN ROSE

European Film Academy Lifetime Achievement Award
Jeanne Moreau

Best Film

References

External links
Winners
Nominees

1997 film awards
European Film Awards ceremonies
1997 in Germany
1997 in Europe